The Icaro Mars is an Italian high-wing, single-place, hang glider that was designed and produced by Icaro 2000.

Design and development
The Mars was built in two sizes for differing pilot weight, with the model numbers reflecting the approximate wing area in square feet. Both sizes are DHV certified as Class 1-2 and also SHV certified. The aircraft is made from aluminum tubing, with the single-surface wing covered in Dacron sailcloth.

Variants
Mars 150
Small sized model for lighter pilots. Its  span wing is cable braced from a single kingpost.
Mars 170
Large sized model for heavier pilots. Its  span wing is cable braced from a single kingpost.

Specifications (Mar 150)

References

Mars
Hang gliders